Brunei Darussalam and Indonesia established diplomatic relations in 1984. Since then, both country enjoys warm and friendly relations. Brunei has an embassy in Jakarta, while Indonesia has an embassy in Bandar Seri Begawan.  Indonesia and Brunei only share direct land borders on the island of Borneo. Since diplomatic relations were established back in 1984,  Overall relations between the two countries were progressing well and that both sides continued to enjoy strong ties in a wide spectrum of co-operations; including trade and investment, tourism, agriculture, marine and fisheries, health, defence, transnational crimes, education, youth, culture and people-to-people contacts.

Both Brunei and Indonesia have many common characteristic traits, these include common frames of reference in history, culture and religion. Their national languages; Indonesian language and Malay language are closely related. The majority of the population of both nations were of Austronesian ancestry or of the  Malay race, with significant Malay culture shared among them. Both nations are Muslim majority countries, members of ASEAN and APEC, and also members of the Non-aligned Movement, and Organisation of Islamic Cooperation.

Country comparison

History
Relations between Indonesia and Brunei has been established since 14th century or perhaps earlier. The Nagarakretagama Javanese poem dated from 1365 CE mentioned Barune (Brunei) in canto 14 as one of Majapahit overseas vassal states. The relations between Brunei and the rest of Indonesian Archipelago perhaps has been established earlier during the era of Srivijayan Empire.

During European colonial era, Indonesia was fell under Dutch possession as Dutch East Indies, while Brunei together with Singapore and Malaysia was fell under British Empire. In 1960s Indonesia and Brunei indirectly locked in military tension through the Konfrontasi, where Indonesia against the formation of Malaysia and dispatches troops infiltrated Sarawak, North Borneo including Brunei.

Republic of Indonesia established diplomatic relations with Brunei Darussalam on 1 January 1984. Brunei Darussalam was recognised by Jakarta on independence in 1984, with Indonesia dropping any claims on the Sultanate in the process. Indonesia also supported Brunei membership to ASEAN in 1984.

Economy and trade
Brunei has been a popular destination for Indonesian workers. As per 31 August 2012, there is around 58,000 Indonesian citizens are staying and working in Brunei. Bilateral trade volume in 2011 reached around US$1.1 billion, coupled with around 3,500 Indonesian products in Brunei's market. In line with Brunei's economic diversication policy, the two countries are seeking to enhance co-operation in the field of marine and fisheries, as well as health sector.

References

 
Bilateral relations of Indonesia
Indonesia